Gonystylus bancanus is a species of tree in the family Thymelaeaceae, growing to over  tall.

Distribution and habitat
Gonystylus bancanus is native to Borneo, Sumatra, Peninsular Malaysia and Singapore. Its habitat is in lowland swamp forest.

Conservation
Gonystylus bancanus has been assessed as Critically Endangered on the IUCN Red List. Past excessive timber extraction has left populations reduced. The species is also threatened by habitat loss from the development of palm oil plantations.

References

bancanus
Flora of Borneo
Flora of Sumatra
Flora of Malaya